Maruti Stotra (Bheema Roopi) or Hanuman Stotra is a 17th-century stotra, hymn of praise, composed in Marathi language by saint-poet of Maharashtra, Samarth Ramdas. It is a compilation of praiseful verses that describe the many aspects and virtues of Maruti Nandan or Hanuman.
There is another hymn to Hanuman called Hanuman Stuti by the same author.

Composer 

This was composed by Samarth Ramdas, the 17th century Marathi saint and poet. One of Samarth Ramdas's societal goals, was to promote physical exercise to develop a healthy society.

Bheema in Sanskrit is a symbol of vastness, and this "Bheema Roopi Stotra" is the first and primary section of Maruti Stotra.

Typical Usage or Recital 

Maruti, also known as Hanuman is the deity of strength is worshiped at most Akhadas or traditional gymnasiums by athletes (wrestlers). These verses are typically recited at the commencement of the 
daily activities, at most Akhadas or wrestling gymnasiums in Maharashtra. Almost all cadets at the Akhadas or traditional gymnasiums start their daily programs with this Maruti Stotra. 

The complete text of Maruti Stotra is listed below

Shri Maruti Stotra

Primary Adaptation 

This text is adapted from the Marathi language publication called Daily Hymns in the Tradition of Samarth Ramadas.

References 

 Nana Dharmadhikari who spread the philosophy of Samarth Ramdas
 http://www.ramdas.org/
 Bheemroopi Maruti Stotra
 http://www.swamisamarth.com/dervan/gad.html

Hindu devotional texts
Marathi-language literature
Cultural history of Maharashtra
Vaishnavism
17th-century songs